The Players Tour Championship 2011/2012 – Event 3 was a professional minor-ranking snooker tournament that took place between 17 and 21 August 2011 at the World Snooker Academy in Sheffield, England.

Ben Woollaston won his first professional title by defeating Graeme Dott 4–2 in the final.

Prize fund and ranking points
The breakdown of prize money and ranking points of the event is shown below: 

1 Only professional players can earn ranking points.

Main draw

Preliminary rounds

Round 1
Best of 7 frames

Round 2
Best of 7 frames

Round 3
Best of 7 frames

Main rounds

Top half

Section 1

Section 2

Section 3

Section 4

Bottom half

Section 5

Section 6

Section 7

Section 8

Finals

Century breaks 
Only from last 128 onwards.

 142, 105  Jamie Cope
 141  Marco Fu
 139  David Grace
 137  Kyren Wilson
 136, 116, 112, 101  Graeme Dott
 136  Alan McManus
 135, 129  Martin Gould
 132, 121  Anthony McGill
 132  Li Yan
 132  Judd Trump
 131, 106  Andrew Higginson
 131, 103  Kurt Maflin
 131  Jimmy White
 131  John Higgins
 128, 112, 100  Neil Robertson
 127, 107, 102  Stephen Lee
 125  Stephen Hendry
 124  Stuart Bingham

 123  Adam Duffy
 121, 105  Matthew Stevens
 118, 111  Andy Hicks
 117, 108  Barry Hawkins
 113  Mark Selby
 112  Paul Davison
 112  Jamie Jones
 111, 108  Michael Holt
 108, 107, 105  Matthew Selt
 106  Ken Doherty
 105  Tony Drago
 104  Michael White
 104  Steve Davis
 103  Ben Woollaston
 102  Joe Jogia
 101  Tom Ford
 100  Fergal O'Brien

References

03
2011 in English sport
August 2011 sports events in the United Kingdom